Pristurus crucifer, also known commonly as the cross-marked semaphore gecko or Valenciennes rock gecko, is a species of lizard in the family Sphaerodactylidae. The species is native to eastern Africa and western Asia.

Geographic range
P. crucifer is found in Eritrea, Ethiopia, Kenya, Saudi Arabia, and Somalia.

Reproduction
P. crucifer is oviparous.

References

Further reading
Largen M, Spawls S (2010). Amphibians and Reptiles of Ethiopia and Eritrea. Frankfurt am Main: Edition Chimaira / Serpents Tale. 694 pp. . (Pristurus crucifer, p. 330).
Rösler H (2000). "Kommentierte Liste der rezent, subrezent und fossil bekannten Geckotaxa (Reptilia: Gekkonomorpha)". Gekkota 2: 28–153. (Pristurus crucifer, p. 106). (in German).
Spawls S, Howell K, Hinkel H, Menegon M (2018). Field Guide to Eat African Reptiles, Second Edition. London: Bloomsbury Natural History. 624 pp. . (Pristurus crucifer, p. 71).
Valenciennes A (1861). "Note sur les animaux d' Abissinie rapportés par M. Courbon ". Comptes rendus hebdomadaires des séances de l'Académie des sciences, Paris 52: 433–434. (Gymnodactylus crucifer, new species, p. 433). (in French).

Pristurus
Geckos of Africa
Reptiles of the Arabian Peninsula
Vertebrates of Eritrea
Reptiles of Ethiopia
Reptiles of Kenya
Reptiles of Somalia
Reptiles described in 1861
Taxa named by Achille Valenciennes